Opinion polling for the 2006 Czech legislative election started immediately after the 2002 legislative election.

Opinion polls

Coalitions

Seats

Coalitions

Leadership polls

References

2006